Rasmus Nielsen (born September 8, 1990) is a Danish ice hockey player who is currently playing for the Herning Blue Fox of the AL-Bank Ligaen.

Nielsen competed in the 2013 IIHF World Championship as a member of the Denmark men's national ice hockey team.

Career statistics

References

External links

1990 births
Living people
Danish ice hockey defencemen